Binh Minh may refer to:
 Bình Minh in Vĩnh Long Province, Vietnam
 Binh Minh Plastic, a company headquartered in Ho Chi Minh City